Offley is a civil parish in the English county of Hertfordshire, between Hitchin and Luton.  The main village is Great Offley, and the parish also contains the nearby hamlets of Little Offley and The Flints.  In the south-west of the parish, near Luton, there are the hamlets of Cockernhoe, Mangrove Green and Tea Green, and also the Putteridge Bury estate; these have LU2 postcodes and 01582 telephone numbers.

Great Offley

Great Offley lies on the top of a chalk escarpment ridge (521 ft/159 metres above sea level) in the centre of the parish (the most north eastern ridge of the Chiltern Hills), and its population is 673.  Offa, King of Mercia in the 8th century, is said to have built a palace here and thus gave his name to the village.  There is a most interesting group of buildings, including Offley Place, which was rebuilt in 1810 but which retains a Tudor porch and a 17th-century wing.

The church named after St. Mary Magdalene contains some attractive monuments. Its nave is Early English, and the chancel was recased and its interior built by Sir Thomas Salusbury in the 18th century. The tower dates from about 1800.

Modern Offley

The village was by-passed by the A505 dual carriageway in the 1970s. Close to the centre of the village is a water tower, which is painted white in response to a campaign started by a Liberal Democrat councilor candidate. Another landmark, within several hundred feet of the water tower, is a radio mast. It is often mistakenly identified as being part of the BT chain that includes Zouches Farm on Blows Down near Luton, but it is in fact owned by Arqiva and used by utility companies, the next one west being located in Isle of Wight Lane, on Dunstable Downs. Its use seems to have decreased in recent years with the number of microwave radio drums (dishes) declining.

The village has its own telephone exchange which is located on Offley Hill. The Hitchin Yeshiva, a Jewish rabbinical school, is based here.

Development 

Housing development in recent years has been restricted to the following areas:

 Kings Walden Road (1980s)
 Meadow Way, terrace of two bedroom houses
 Oflley Chapel, Luton Road, converted into housing units (1990s)
 Westbury Farm, refurbishment of existing flats in Farm House, conversion of barns and sheds into housing, new houses also built.
 John Hall Court

Bloor Homes who have been building on regeneration sites in Luton have submitted proposals for a large scale development on the Putteridgebury Estate. This is likely to be opposed by local residents and groups such as the Keep East of Luton Green and Campaign to Protect Rural England (CPRE).

Local services

The village still has a Post Office/General stores, the butchers shop was closed in recent times to be replaced by an Ladies hairdressers, there had been one previously in the late 1970s located in a property adjoining the butchers shop. There is now a butchers shop at Offley hoo farm which has been there for a few years.
The Village Petrol station closed in the late 1980s although a garage operated on the site until 2001 when the land was sold for development.

Offley Endowed JMI School is situated close to the village centre.

Public houses

At one time Great Offley had six pubs in the village, these have now decreased to two with a third being converted into a Chinese Restaurant.

 Green Man (Chef and Brewer)
 Red Lion
 The Bull (now closed and converted into a private dwelling)
 The Cock became The Crusty Loaf and then the Lobster Tail restaurant which subsequently closed and has been turned into a private dwelling.
 The Gloucester Arms
 refurbished and name changed to Prince Henry
 further refurbishment and name changed to Shaker Browns
 renamed as Astons (Restaurant and Bar)
 Reverted to Gloucester Arms
 Converted into Chinese Restaurant The Offley Oriental

Recreation

 Offley and Stopsley Cricket Club, play at the Recreation Ground.
 Offley and District Riding Club have at least four shows at the Old Football Field, Luton White Hill.
 Luton and District Aeronautical Society fly remote control model aircraft at a field at the top of Chalk Hill to the south east of the village.

There is also a fishing club which uses the Long Pond and the Pump Pond which are located along Salusbury Lane.

Little Offley
Little Offley is a small hamlet lying 1½ miles north-west of Great Offley, and it is reached via a bridge over the A505.  It contains a late Tudor brick-built manor house.

The Hitchin Yeshiva is based in Wellbury House which is a mile north east of Little Offley.

The Flints
The Flints lies just ½ mile west of Great Offley, and its population is 40.

Cockernhoe

Cockernhoe lies 2½ miles south-west of Great Offley, and its population is 191.

Cockernhoe has a village school and a small church (St Hugh's).

Mangrove Green
Mangrove Green lies just north of Cockernhoe and south of Putteridge Bury, and its population is 108. The village has one pub, the King William IV.

Tea Green
Tea Green lies 2½ miles south of Great Offley, and its population is 44.
Tea Green sits on top of a chalk ridge on the opposite side of Lilley Bottom/Mimram Valley. A major landmark is the tall water tower which is next to the White Horse Pub.

Two of the oldest barns in the area (dating from the 16th century) are located at Tankards and Crutchmore Farms.

Offley Chase

Lies approximately 2 miles south west of Offley along Lilley Bottom.

Putteridge Bury 

Putteridge Bury belongs to the University of Bedfordshire, previously being used as the Management Campus of the University of Luton, it was originally acquired in 1965 as a teacher training college. The mansion was built in the style of Chequers by architects Sir Ernest George and Alfred Yeats and completed in 1911.  The grounds were redesigned by Edwin L Lutyens, soon to be recognised as the foremost architect of the era, and planted by Gertrude Jekyll, one of the first lady Victorian gardeners.  Particular features are the reflective pool and massive yew hedges. As well as the mansion house the estate has a farm and a collection of spread out houses.

The Putteridge estate is a mixture of arable farmland and woodland; as well as the occasional visiting muntjac and fallow deer, the estate is home to Lady Amherst's pheasant (Chrysolophus amherstiae) as well as the more common pheasant.

Agriculture and wildlife

The land use in the parish is a mixture of arable, and woodland with some minor seasonal grazing for beef cattle and sheep. To the east of the village all the round to the south east forms part of the King's Walden estate. During the winter months pheasant and partridge shooting takes with several shooting syndicates operating to the north of the village as well as a big shoot organised by King's Walden Estate.

Red kites along with common buzzard and sparrowhawks can be seen in the area.

Decline in farming

Many of the farms in the area are no longer used for agriculture and some have been sold off for housing development. The fields being taken over by farms at a greater distance, this has happened due to technological advances which make small farms un-economical to run. Several farms up until the 1970s had herds of dairy cattle but low milk prices forced many farms to turn to arable farming.

Crops

Main crops include:

 Barley
 Wheat
 Rapeseed

Woodland

Much of the woodland is not used for timber and is made up of oak, beech and horse chestnut trees, with smaller plantations of pine and spruce. During the spring many of the woods are carpeted with bluebells.

The area is home to a sizeable herd of fallow deer and muntjac can also be seen.

Chiltern Way

The 152-mile Chiltern Way long-distance footpath passes through the parish, as does the 170-mile Chilterns Cycleway.

Offley at War 1939 - 1945

Offley was Headquarters for an Auxiliary Territorial Service (ATS) Searchlight unit based in Hoo Lane, that had detachments in Hitchin along Bedford Road, Chapel Foot along London Road, as well as at Whitwell and Diamond End.

Lancaster bomber crash

At 7.15am on 18 July 1944 a Lancaster Mk.111 bomber belonging to 115 Squadron RAF crashed into the farmhouse at West End Farm killing the crew as well as the farmers wife and two daughters (one of whom was home on leave from the Auxiliary Territorial Service).

The aircraft LM616 (KO J) had left its base at RAF Witchford near Ely several hours earlier to support Allied ground forces taking part in Operation Goodwood during the Normandy campaign. The Royal Air Force and United States Army Air Forces objective was to bomb units of the 16th Luftwaffe Field Division and the 21st Panzer Division which were located around the Manneville area in France.

LM616 received severe damage during the raid, in which its controls and navigation aids were shot up. The aircraft had descended through low cloud only to see the high escarpment of the Chiltern Hills at Offley loom into view too late for the crew to take immediate action. The aircraft hit trees in a wood on top of Birkitt Hill before colliding with the farmhouse at West End Farm.

Glebe Farm Explosion

At 3pm on 8 January 1945 a US Army lorry carrying munitions was involved in a road accident with a petrol tanker as it was passing Glebe Farm at the Flints.

The drivers managed to evacuate nearby residents however a bus from Luton came round the corner just as an explosion occurred, killing three US servicemen on the bus and injuring 21 others. The explosion was so severe that it made a crater on the road 50 feet wide and 14 feet deep.

The Windmill and Farm were completely destroyed and Flint cottages were severely damaged, other houses in Offley suffered extensive blast damage.

References

External links

Great Offley - a resident's page about local history with many images.
Offley & Stopsley Cricket Club - Contains pictures, match reports, results, statistics and features from the cricket club
 Offley Endowed Primary School
 Cockernhoe Endowed C of E Primary School
Offley Parish Council

Villages in Hertfordshire
Civil parishes in Hertfordshire